These are the official results of the Men's 50 km walk event at the 1986 European Championships in Stuttgart, West Germany, held on 31 August 1986.

Medalists

Abbreviations
All times shown are in hours:minutes:seconds

Final

Participation
According to an unofficial count, 28 athletes from 14 countries participated in the event.

 (1)
 (3)
 (3)
 (1)
 (2)
 (3)
 (2)
 (1)
 (1)
 (3)
 (2)
 (3)
 (2)
 (1)

See also
 1980 Men's Olympic 50km Walk (Moscow)
 1982 Men's European Championships 50km Walk (Athens)
 1983 Men's World Championships 50km Walk (Helsinki)
 1984 Men's Olympic 50km Walk (Los Angeles)
 1987 Men's World Championships 50km Walk (Rome)
 1988 Men's Olympic 50km Walk (Seoul)
 1990 Men's European Championships 50km Walk (Split)

References

External links
 Results

Walk 50 km
Racewalking at the European Athletics Championships